Czechoslovakia competed at the 1920 Summer Olympics in Antwerp, Belgium.  It was the first time that the nation had competed at the Summer Olympic Games, after the republic was founded in 1918.  Previously, Bohemia had competed at the Olympic Games from 1900 to 1912.

Medalists

Aquatics

Swimming

Four swimmers, all male, represented Czechoslovakia in 1920. It was the nation's debut in the sport as well as the Olympics. None of the swimmers were able to advance to the finals.

Ranks given are within the heat.

 Men

Water polo

Czechoslovakia competed in the Olympic water polo tournament for the first time in 1920. A modified version of the Bergvall System was in use at the time. The team was shut out in both of its games, first by Sweden in the round of 16 and then by the Netherlands in the bronze medal quarterfinals.

Squad

 Round of 16

 Bronze medal quarterfinals

 Final rank 11th

Athletics

16 athletes represented Czechoslovakia in the country's Olympics debut in 1920. The best result for the team was Vohralík's 4th-place finish in the 1500 metres, just 1.6 seconds behind the bronze medal winner.

Ranks given are within the heat.

Cycling

Four cyclists represented Czechoslovakia in the nation's Olympic debut 1920. The four cyclists competed in the road time trials, placing ninth as a team. Procházka was the best of the four, finishing 34th individually.

Road cycling

Fencing

Nine fencers represented Czechoslovakia in 1920. It was the nation's debut in the sport. The country had two individual fencers reach semifinals, but neither advanced to a final. The nation's teams were unsuccessful in team competitions, unable to win a single bout.

Ranks given are within the group.

Football

Czechoslovakia competed in the Olympic football tournament for the first time. The squad started strong, outscoring opponents 15 to 1 in the first three rounds to qualify for the final. There the team fell behind 2–0 to Belgium before abandoning the match in protest in the 40th minute. Czechoslovakia, which was not guaranteed the silver medal by advancing to the final due to the use of the Bergvall System, was disqualified from the competition, losing the opportunity to play in the second-place tournament. 

 First round

 Quarterfinals

 Semifinals

 Final

Final rank Disqualified

Gymnastics

Sixteen gymnasts represented Czechoslovakia in 1920. It was the nation's debut in the sport, though Bohemia had competed three times previously. No gymnasts competed in the individual all-around, and the country sent a team in only one of the three team events. That team took fourth place out of five.

Artistic gymnastics

Ice hockey

Czechoslovakia competed in the inaugural Olympic ice hockey tournament. The team took a bronze medal, thanks in large part to the use of the Bergvall System in the tournament. This system allowed the team to continue competing despite an early loss. Czechoslovakia was blown out by Canada, 15 to nil, in the quarterfinals. Because Canada went on to win the gold medal, the Bergvall System operated to put Czechoslovakia in the silver medal tournament; there, the team received a bye in the semifinals and went immediately to play against the United States in the silver medal match. The Americans did Canada one better, beating Czechoslovakia 16 to nothing. Still the Czechoslovakian team was not done; having lost only to the gold and silver medalists, the team competed for the bronze medal. Again Czechoslovakia received a semifinal bye, facing Sweden in the bronze medal match. This time, they were on the right end of the shutout, beating the Swedes 1 to zero to finish in third place.

 Roster
Coach:  Adolf Dušek

 Gold medal quarterfinals

 Silver medal match

 Bronze medal match

Final rank  Bronze

Rowing

Fifteen rowers represented Czechoslovakia in the nation's debut in 1920 (Bohemia had competed in rowing once, in 1912). The nation sent three boats, each of which came in last in their initial heats in its event and did not advance.

Ranks given are within the heat.

Shooting

Eight shooters represented Czechoslovakia in 1920. It was the nation's debut in the sport as well as the Olympics.

Tennis

Seven tennis players, including one woman, competed for Czechoslovakia in 1920. It was the nation's debut in the sport as well as the Olympics, though Bohemia had competed three times. Three of the Czechoslovakian men had previously competed. Skrbková, the lone woman, did not compete in the singles but only as part of a mixed pair with Žemla-Rázný. That pair won the bronze medal, contributing three of the nation's four match wins in 1920. Žemla-Rázný was also involved in the fourth, as part of a men's pair with Ardelt which won its first match before being defeated. The other two men's pairs, as well as all four men's singles players, were defeated in their first match.

Weightlifting

Two weightlifters represented Czechoslovakia in 1920. It was the nation's debut in the sport as well as the Games. Wágner placed fifth and Dvořák took eighth in their respective weight classes.

Wrestling

Ten wrestlers, two in each of the Greco-Roman weight classes, competed for Czechoslovakia in 1920. It was the nation's debut in the sport as well as the Games, though Bohemia had competed twice previously. Czechoslovakia had no freestyle wrestlers in 1920.

Greco-Roman

References

 
 
 International Olympic Committee results database

Nations at the 1920 Summer Olympics
1920
Olympics